Rakowicki Cemetery is a historic necropolis and a cultural heritage monument located on 26 Rakowicka Street in the centre of Kraków, Poland. It lies within the Administrative District No. 1 Stare Miasto meaning "Old Town" – distinct from the Kraków Old Town situated further south. Founded at the beginning of the 19th century when the region was part of Austrian Galicia, the cemetery was expanded several times, and at present covers an area of about 42 hectares. Many notable Cracovians, among them the parents of Pope John Paul II, are buried here.

History
The Rakowicki Cemetery was set up in 1800–1802 at an estate in Prądnik Czerwony village, originally on an area of only 5.6 ha. It was first used in mid-January 1803. The new cemetery came into existence in relation to a public health-related government ban on burials in old church cemeteries within the city. The land was purchased for 1,150 zlotys from the monastery of the Discalced Carmelites of Czerna, and built with funds from the city and the surrounding villages (including some future Districts of Kraków): Rakowice, Prądnik Czerwony and Biały, Olsza, Grzegórzki, Piaski, Bronowice, Czarna Village, Nowa Village, Krowodrza and Kawiory, all granted the right to bury their dead there. The first funeral took place on January 15, 1803, with the burial of an 18-year-old named Apolonia from the Lubowiecki family of Bursikowa estate.

In 1807, the first well was dug, and in 1812 the first big cross was built, paid for by public contributions. Rakowicki Cemetery was repeatedly enlarged over the years. The first expansion came in 1836 when 100% more land was bought from Carmelite friars for 5,000 zloty. The design of the new part of the cemetery was commissioned from architect Karol R. Kremer, head of the department of urban construction, who gave it the form of a city park. The surrounding wall was made using bricks and stones obtained from the demolished Church of All Saints. The newly built cemetery was blessed on November 2, 1840. The first chapel was erected in 1862, six years after the Austrian permit was issued. In 1863 the city purchased more land from Carmelite friars – and from Walery Rzewuski – on the west side of the cemetery, and buried there victims of an epidemic of 1866. In 1877 the new administrative centre was built along with the mortuary. The next expansion took place ten years later, in the autumn of 1886. In this new section, the nominal painter Jan Matejko was buried there, among other notables.

Between 1933 and 1934 the cemetery was widened at its north end, across an old military base, with a city street eliminated. In 1976, it was finally entered into the list of local heritage sites, and in 1979 it was the last place visited by Pope John Paul II during his June 2–10 first papal visit to his native homeland.

Cultural significance

The necropolis is a place of burial of the ordinary citizens of the city as well as national heroes: famous writers, scientists, representatives of noble families, independence fighters, political and social activists, leaders and participants of Polish independence movements and insurrections, and veterans of the 20th century's two World Wars, among others. The name Rakowicki Cemetery derives from the name of the Rakowicka street, once a suburban road leading to the village of Rakowice 2 km away.

Layout
Within the cemetery, there are special sections allocated to graves of the participants of Polish national uprisings such as the November Uprising, the January Uprising, and the Kraków Uprising. First World War casualties are buried there, including ethnically Polish soldiers conscripted into all three imperial armies: Austrian, Russian, and Prussian – most of whom died in local hospitals. There are members of Polish Legions; the participants of the Charge at Rokitna; the workers killed during strikes of 1936; Second World War casualties including soldiers of the Polish September campaign of 1939. All Allied pilots shot down over Poland are buried here, including those originally buried in Warsaw, along with hundreds of Commonwealth of Nations casualties and prisoners of war who died during the German occupation; the latter brought together by the BAOR into a Commonwealth plot containing a Cross of Sacrifice. Polish partisans, the victims of Nazi crimes; and Soviet soldiers who died during their anti-German attack on Kraków in 1945, are buried here. The Commonwealth War Graves Commission maintain Commonwealth graves.

National significance
The cemetery is a national monument of great historical and artistic value. Its selected gravestones and mausoleums are the work of well-known architects, among them, Teofil Żebrawski, Feliks Księżarski, Sławomir Odrzywolski, Jakub Szczepkowski, as well as sculptors such as Konstanty Laszczka, Tadeusz Błotnicki, Wacław Szymanowski, Karol Hukana and others. In 1981 a Public Committee for the Preservation of Kraków was founded, with a special sub-committee for the saving of the cemeteries of Kraków and other regional heritage sites. OKRK is organizing an annual collection for the restoration of historic tombs and gravestones. Works are being conducted simultaneously at the Rakowicki Cemetery and the New Foothill Cemetery (with the cooperation of the Association Podgórze.pl). OKRK is organizing an annual donation drive, raising funds for the renovation of historic tombs and the public monuments. Public funds are used for the restoration of deteriorating tombs without owners.

Notable interments
Those buried at the Rakowicki Cemetery include:

 Teodor Axentowicz (1859–1938), painter
 Gabriela Balicka-Iwanowska (1871–1962), botanist, legislator
 Michał Bałucki (1837–1901), playwright and poet
 Andrzej Bursa (1932–1957), poet and writer
 Adam Chmielowski (1845–1916), nobleman and painter
 Hanna Helena Chrzanowska (1902–1973), Roman Catholic nurse
 Maximilian Cercha (1818–1907), painter
 Emil Czyrniański (1824–1888), chemist
 Ignacy Daszyński (1866–1936), socialist politician and journalist
 Józef Dietl (1804–1878), physician
 Stanisław Estreicher (1869–1939), historian
 Józef Andrzej Gierowski (1922–2006), historian
 Marek Grechuta (1945–2006), singer, songwriter, composer, and lyricist
 Julian Gutowski (1823–1890), politician
 Henryk Hiż (1917–2006), analytical philosopher
 Antonina Hoffmann (1842–1897), theatre actress
 Emeryk Hutten-Czapski (1828–1896), nobleman, scholar, and numismatist
 Roman Ingarden (1893–1970), philosopher
 Tadeusz Kantor (1915–1990), theatre director
 Oskar Kolberg (1814–1890), ethnographer and folklorist
 Apollo Korzeniowski (1820–1869), poet, playwright, translator, and father of novelist Joseph Conrad
 Juliusz Kossak (1824–1899), painter
 Wojciech Kossak (1856–1942), painter
 Stanisław Kutrzeba (1876–1946), historian and politician
 Barbara Kwiatkowska-Lass (1940–1995), actress
 Eugeniusz Kwiatkowski (1888–1974), politician and economist
 Tadeusz Lehr-Spławiński (1891–1965), linguist
 Juliusz Leo (1861–1918), politician and academic
 Anatol Lewicki (1841–1899), historian
 Zygmunt Marek (1872–1931), socialist politician
 Jan Matejko (1838–1893), painter
 Józef Mehoffer (1869–1946), painter and decorative artist
 Piotr Michałowski (1800–1855), painter
 Helena Modrzejewska (1840–1909), actress
 Tadeusz Pankiewicz (1908–1993), pharmacist
 Stefan Pawlicki (1839–1916), philosopher
 Henryk Reyman (1897–1963), footballer
 Lucjan Rydel (1870–1918), playwright and poet
 John Segrue (1884-1942), English journalist
 Klemens Stefan Sielecki (1903–1980), engineer
 Maciej Słomczyński (1922–1998), translator and writer
 Ignaz Sowinski (1858–1917), architect
 Władysław Szafer (1886–1970), botanist
 Józef Szujski (1835–1883), politician, historian, and poet
 Wislawa Szymborska (1923–2012), poet, essayist, translator, and Nobel Prize winner
 Adolf Szyszko-Bohusz (1883–1948), architect
 Rafał Taubenschlag (1881–1958), historian of law
 Dorota Terakowska (1938–2004), Polish writer and journalist
 Georg Trakl (1887–1914), Austrian poet
 Adam Vetulani (1901–1976), historian
 Jerzy Vetulani (1936–2017), neuroscientist
 Tadeusz Vetulani (1897–1952), agriculturalist
 Rudolf Weigl (1883–1957), biologist
 Bolesław Wieniawa-Długoszowski (1881–1942), general, politician, freemason, diplomat, and poet
 Wiktor Zin (1925–2007), architect and graphic artist
 Mikołaj Zyblikiewicz (1823–1887), politician and lawyer

Points of interest

See also
The Lesser Polish Way
Powązki Cemetery
Powązki Military Cemetery
Lychakiv Cemetery
Rakowice, Krakow

Notes and references

 Internetowy lokalizator grobów Zarządu Cmentarzy Komunalnych w Krakowie
 Galeria zdjęć Cmentarza Rakowickiego

External links
 Online grave locator in Krakow
 
 

Roman Catholic cemeteries in Poland
Cemeteries in Kraków
Military memorials and cemeteries in Poland
Tourist attractions in Kraków
Commonwealth War Graves Commission cemeteries in Poland
1803 establishments in Poland
1803 establishments in the Holy Roman Empire